The 1920 New Zealand tour rugby to New South Wales was the ninth tour by the New Zealand national team to Australia. The three most important matches on the tour were played against the New South Wales selection, and the All Blacks won the 3 match series 3–0. 

After the First World War, rugby union in Australia was initially only resumed within New South Wales (many players switched to rugby league, especially in Queensland), so official Test matches between the two national sides did not resume until 1929. 

In 1986 the Australian Rugby Union accorded Test status to the matches New South Wales played against full international teams in the 1920 to 1928 period, but the New Zealand Rugby Union does not record these matches as Tests.

Before and after the tour, New Zealand played some matches in their own country against provincial selections. The following year, New South Wales visited New Zealand on their 1921 tour.

Match summary
Complete list of matches played by the All Blacks in New South Wales:

 Test matches

Notes

References

New Zealand tour
Australia tour
New Zealand national rugby union team tours of Australia